Pietro Marc'Antonio Cesti (baptism 5 August 162314 October 1669), known today primarily as an Italian composer of the Baroque era, was also a singer (tenor), and organist. He was "the most celebrated Italian musician of his generation".

Biography 
He was born at Arezzo, and studied with various local musicians. In 1637 he joined the Order of Friars Minor, or Franciscans, a Roman Catholic religious group founded by Francis of Assisi. While he was in Volterra he turned more toward secular music, perhaps due to the patronage and influence of the powerful Medici family. Here he also came in contact with Salvator Rosa, who wrote libretti for a number of Cesti's cantatas. By 1650 Cesti's calling as a Franciscan friar and his success as a singer and composer for operas was coming into conflict, and he was officially reprimanded. In 1652 he became a member of the court at Innsbruck of Ferdinand Charles, Archduke of Austria. After holding a post somewhere in Florence as maestro di cappella, he entered the papal chapel in 1660. In 1666 he became Vice-Kapellmeister at Vienna, and died at Venice in 1669.

Music 

Cesti is known principally as a composer of operas. The most celebrated of these were La Dori (Innsbruck, 1657), Il pomo d'oro (Vienna, 1668) and Orontea (1656). Il pomo d'oro (The Golden Apple) was written for the wedding in Vienna of Emperor Leopold I in 1666, and first performed in 1668, in a famously lavish production. It was far more elaborate than contemporary Venetian operas, including a large orchestra, numerous choruses, and various mechanical devices used to stage things like gods descending from heaven (deus ex machina), naval battles, and storms.

Orontea was revived seventeen times in the next thirty years, making it one of the most frequently performed operas on the continent in the mid-17th century. Even Samuel Pepys owned a copy of the score. It includes a well-known soprano aria "Intorno all'idol mio" (English: "Around my idol").

Cesti was also a composer of chamber cantatas, and his operas are notable for the pure and delicate style of their airs, more suited to the chamber than to the stage. He wrote in the bel canto style of the 17th century, and his compositions were heavily influenced by his career as a professional singer. His musical writing owes much to the emerging tonality of the time.

Works

Recordings 
Pietro Antonio Cesti "Pasticcio", Festwochen der Alten Musik in Innsbruck 1980, excerpts from operas "Il pomo d'oro", "Argia", "Tito", "Orontea", "Dori", "Semirami". Performers: René Jacobs, Judith Nelson, William Christie, Konrad Junghänel. ORF Edition Alte Musik.
Le disgrazie d’amore, Auser Musici, Carlo Ipata, director, Hyperion CDA67771 (2010)
Alma Mia, Raquel Andueza, soprano with La Galania directed by Fernández Baena: excerpts from operas L'Argia, La Dori, Orontea, Il Tito, and two cantatas: Non si parli più d'Amore and Ò quanto concorso. Anima e Corpo AeC003 (2014)

See also 
 Baroque opera
 Francesco Cavalli
 Claudio Monteverdi, an older contemporary of Cesti

References 

 David L. Burrows. "Antonio Cesti", Grove Music Online, ed. L. Macy (accessed December 29, 2005), grovemusic.com (subscription access).
 Grout, Donald; Claude Palisca. A History of Western Music, 6th edition. W. W. Norton & Company. New York, 2001.

External links 

 

1623 births
1669 deaths
People from Arezzo
Italian male classical composers
Italian Baroque composers
Italian opera composers
Male opera composers
17th-century Italian composers
17th-century male musicians